State Highway 117 (RJ SH 117, SH-117) is a state highway in Rajasthan state of India that connects Diggi in Tonk district of Rajasthan with Justana in Sawai Madhopur district of Rajasthan.

SH-117 has been made by upgrading Major District Road 1. This highway connects SH-12 in Diggi to NH-148N in Jastana.

References

External links

State Highways in Rajasthan